The Syracuse Grand Prix was a motor race held at Syracuse Circuit in Sicily, Italy. For most of its existence, it formed part of the Formula One non-Championship calendar, usually being held near the beginning of the season before the World Championship races.

Results

References

 
Recurring sporting events established in 1951
Recurring sporting events disestablished in 1967
Sport in Syracuse, Sicily